Kimberley Ashton (born 21 August 1987), also known as Kim Ashton, is a cyclist and former badminton player from Jersey. She represented Jersey in badminton at the 2010 Commonwealth Games and cycling at the 2018 Commonwealth Games. She has also competed at the Island Games.

Career 
Ashton originally competed in the sport of badminton. She and mixed-doubles partner Chris Cottilard were Jersey's first badminton athletes to reach a final math at the 2009 Island Games. Ashton went on to compete in women's badminton singles at the 2010 Commonwealth Games in New Delhi.

Due to injuries she accumulated during her badminton career, Ashton took up cycling as a hobby. Ashton competed as a cyclist in the 2011 and 2015 Island Games and was Jersey's most successful athlete at the latter. Ashton had planned to compete at the 2017 Island Games but withdrew due to her issues with the team selection policy. In 2018, Ashton announced she would retire from sports after competing in the 2018 Gold Coast Commonwealth Games.

Major results

Badminton 

 2005 - Island Games (Shetland)
 Team event - 1st place
 Women's singles - 3rd place
 2009 - Island Games (Aland)
 Mixed doubles - 1st place
 Women's doubles - 3rd place
 2010 - Commonwealth Games - Badminton Singles - 33rd place

Cycling 

 2011 - Island Games (Isle of Wight) 
 Women's individual road race - 1st place
 Women's team road race - 3rd place - with Jo Le Cocq and Sue Townsend
 Women's individual town centre criterium - 3rd place
 Women's team town centre criterium - 3rd place - with Jo Le Cocq and Sue Townsend
 2015 - Island Games (Jersey)
 Women's individual road race - 1st place
 Women's individual time trial - 1st place
 Women's individual town centre criterium - 1st place
 Women's team road race - 1st place - with Laura Chillingworth and Clare Treharne
 Women's team time trial - 1st place - with Laura Chillingworth and Clare Treharne
 Women's team town centre criterium - 1st place - with Laura Chillingworth and Clare Treharne
 2016 - British Cycling Women’s Road Series - 1st place
 2018 - Commonwealth Games - Road Race - 20th place

References

1987 births
Living people
Jersey sportswomen
Jersey badminton players
Badminton players at the 2010 Commonwealth Games
Cyclists at the 2018 Commonwealth Games
Commonwealth Games competitors for Jersey